Nepheronia argia, the large vagrant, is a butterfly of the family Pieridae. It is found throughout Africa.

The wingspan is 50–65 mm for males and 48–70 mm for females. Adults are on wing year-round in warmer areas with peaks in late summer and autumn.

The larvae feed on Hippocratea longipetolata, Cassipurea ruwenzorensis, and Ritchiea species.

Subspecies
N. a. argia (Fabricius, 1775) (Senegal, Gambia, Guinea-Bissau, Guinea, Sierra Leone, Liberia, Ivory Coast, Ghana, Togo, Nigeria, Cameroon, Equatorial Guinea, Congo, Democratic Republic of the Congo, Angola, Sudan, northern Uganda)
N. a. argolisia (Stoneham, 1957) (Uganda, western Kenya, western Tanzania, north-western Zambia)
N. a. mhondana (Suffert, 1904) (eastern Kenya, Tanzania, Zambia, Malawi, eastern Zimbabwe, central and northern Mozambique)
N. a. varia (Trimen, 1864) (South Africa)
N. a. variegata Henning, 1994 (southern Mozambique, South Africa, Eswatini)

References

Seitz, A. Die Gross-Schmetterlinge der Erde 13: Die Afrikanischen Tagfalter. Plate XIII 15 form aurora Suffert, 1904

Butterflies described in 1775
argia
Taxa named by Johan Christian Fabricius